Randomized (Block) Coordinate Descent Method is an optimization algorithm popularized by Nesterov (2010) and Richtárik and Takáč (2011). The first analysis of this method, when applied to the problem of minimizing a smooth convex function, was performed by Nesterov (2010). In Nesterov's analysis the method needs to be applied to a quadratic perturbation of the original function with an unknown scaling factor. Richtárik and Takáč (2011) give iteration complexity bounds which do not require this, i.e., the method is applied to the objective function directly. Furthermore, they generalize the setting to the problem of minimizing a composite function, i.e., sum of a smooth convex and a (possibly nonsmooth) convex block-separable function:

Example (block-separable regularizers): 
 

Algorithm
Consider the optimization problem

where  is a convex and smooth function.

Smoothness: By smoothness we mean the following: we assume
with constants . That is, we assume that

Nesterov, and Richtarik and Takac showed that the following algorithm converges to the optimal point:

     Input:  //starting point
     Output: 
 
     set x := x_0
 
     for k := 1, ... do
         choose coordinate , uniformly at random
         update  
     end for

Convergence rate
Since the iterates of this algorithm are random vectors, a complexity result would give a bound on the number of iterations needed for the method to output an approximate solution with high probability. It was shown in  that if 
, 
where , 
 is an optimal solution,
then .

Example on particular function
The following Figure shows
how  develops during iterations, in principle.
The problem is

Extension to block coordinate setting

One can naturally extend this algorithm not only just to coordinates, but to blocks of coordinates. Assume that we have space . This space has 5 coordinate directions, concretely

in which Random Coordinate Descent Method can move. However, one can group some coordinate directions into blocks and we can have instead of those 5 coordinate directions 3 block coordinate directions (see image).

See also
 Coordinate descent
 Gradient descent
 Mathematical optimization

References

Gradient methods